Quasi-delict is a French legal term used in some civil law jurisdictions, encompassing the common law concept of  negligence as the breach of a non-wilful extra-contractual obligation to third parties.

References

See also
 Law of Obligations
 Tort

Law of obligations
Tort law
French legal terminology
Law of negligence
Delict
Civil law legal terminology